Mathias Fredriksen (born 28 April 1994) is a Norwegian footballer who plays as a midfielder for the Eliteserien side Mjøndalen.
 
He played youth football for Tollnes, but joined Odd's youth team after the 2009 season. In mid-2012 he signed for the senior team. He was also capped as a Norway youth international. Fredriksen made his senior league debut in a May 2013 0-1 loss against Start.

Career statistics

References 

1994 births
Living people
Sportspeople from Porsgrunn
Norwegian footballers
Association football midfielders
Odds BK players
Mjøndalen IF players
Norwegian First Division players
Eliteserien players
Norway youth international footballers